What a Song Can Do is the ninth studio album by American country music trio Lady A. It was released on October 22, 2021, through Big Machine Records. The album includes the single "Like a Lady" and thirteen other tracks. It is also the first new album released under the name Lady A and second after the deluxe edition of Ocean in 2020.

Background
Prior to the album's release, the band issued the extended play What a Song Can Do (Chapter One), containing tracks from the album. This extended play contains seven songs, and the album contains seven more. Thirteen of the project's fourteen songs were co-written by at least one member of the band; Dave Haywood wrote "Workin' on This Love" by himself and even sings lead vocals on it, making this the first and so far only album to feature a solo from him. The track "Friends Don't Let Friends" features guest vocals from Carly Pearce, Thomas Rhett, and Darius Rucker. Dann Huff is the album's producer.

Critical reception
Stephen Thomas Erlewine of AllMusic wrote that "The 14 songs never deviate from the middle of the road, a path they follow with the urgency of a Sunday afternoon drive[...] they give the arrangements enough room to be breezy and help keep the melody in the forefront -- tricks that make for a very pleasant listen, even if it is quite a familiar one."

Track listing

Personnel
Adapted from liner notes.

Lady A
Dave Haywood - vocals (all tracks), acoustic guitar (all tracks), bouzouki (track 8), mandolin (tracks 1, 2, 4, 6, 10-13), percussion (track 8), resonator guitar (track 8), strings (tracks 1, 8), synthesizer (track 1), tambourine (track 10), bar noise (track 1)
Charles Kelley - vocals (all tracks)
Hillary Scott - vocals (all tracks)

Additional musicians
Roy Agee - trombone (track 11), bass trombone (track 11)
David Angell - violin (track 7)
Monisa Angell - viola (track 7)
Kevin Bate - cello (track 7)
Jenny Bifano - violin (track 7)
Tom Bukovac - electric guitar (all tracks except 11 & 13)
Julian Bunetta - programming (track 9)
Vinnie Ciesielski - flugelhorn (track 11), trumpet (track 11), horn arrangements (track 11)
Dave Cohen - B-3 organ (tracks 1, 2, 6, 14), keyboards (track 3), piano (tracks 2, 4-7), programming (track 11), synthesizer (tracks 4, 5, 7, 11, 12), synth bass (track 11)
David Davidson - violin (track 3)
Stuart Duncan - fiddle (track 3)
Justin Ebach - electric guitar (track 5), programming (track 5), synthesizer (track 5), synth bass (track 5)
Sam Ellis - programming (track 2)
Alicia Engstrom - violin (track 7)
Shannon Forrest - drums (tracks 10, 11, 13), percussion (track 13)
Paul Franklin - steel guitar (tracks 2, 4, 5, 10, 13, 14)
Jesse Frasure - programming (track 4)
Chris Gelbuda - electric guitar (track 11)
Austin Hoke - cello (track 7)
Dann Huff - bouzouki (track 5), dobro (tracks 3, 5), dobro solo (track 5), electric guitar (tracks 1-3, 5, 6, 9-12, 14), electric guitar solo (tracks 1-3, 6, 9, 12, 14), high string acoustic guitar (track 5), programming (tracks 2-4, 9-13), synthesizer (tracks 10, 13), synth bass (track 3)
David Huff - programming (all tracks), synth bass (track 10)
Jun Iwasaki - violin (track 7)
Martin Johnson - electric guitar (track 3)
Charlie Judge - B-3 organ (tracks 9, 11), piano (tracks 2, 11), synthesizer (tracks 2, 5, 7, 8, 10, 12, 13), synth bass (track 12)
Betsy Lamb - viola (track 7)
Tony Lucido - bass guitar (tracks 10, 11, 13)
Justin Niebank - programming (all tracks except 3)
Brandon Paddock - dobro (track 3), programming (track 3)
Carly Pearce - featured vocals (track 9)
Jordan Reynolds - programming (track 1)
Thomas Rhett - featured vocals (track 9)
Jerry Roe - drums (tracks 8, 9), percussion (track 8)
Darius Rucker - featured vocals (track 9)
Jimmie Lee Sloas - bass guitar (tracks 1-9, 12, 14)
Aaron Sterling - drums (tracks 1-7, 12, 14), percussion (tracks 3, 6, 7, 14)
Ilya Toshinsky - acoustic guitar (all tracks except 3 & 7), banjo (tracks 3, 5, 9), dobro (track 7), mandolin (track 3)
Alysa Vanderheym - synthesizer (track 10), background vocals (track 10)
Derek Wells - electric guitar (tracks 10, 11, 13), electric guitar solo (track 11)
Kris Wilkinson - string arrangements (track 7)
Karen Winkelmann - violin (track 7)

Chart performance

References

2021 albums
Big Machine Records albums
Lady A albums
Albums produced by Dann Huff